The Leader of the Government in the Senate (historically also known as the Leader of the Senate) is the government's most senior cabinet minister in the Australian Senate and the main government spokesperson in the Senate. His or her Opposition counterpart is the Leader of the Opposition in the Senate.

The current Leader of the Government in the Senate is Penny Wong, elected unanimously to the position on 23 May 2022, replacing Simon Birmingham. The current Deputy Leader of the Government in the Senate is Don Farrell.

Role and history
According to constitutional convention, the government is formed in the House of Representatives and the Prime Minister is a member of that chamber and the Prime Minister is the leader of the Government in the House of Representatives. The Leader of the Government in the Senate has duties and privileges that parallel those of the Prime Minister, in that he or she has overarching responsibility for all policy areas and acts as the government's principal spokesperson in the upper house. He or she is also entitled to sit at the table of the Senate, and has priority in gaining recognition from the President of the Senate during debate. Another similarity is that the leader typically announces changes to government officeholders in the Senate, including ministers, leadership and whips. The leader also has some responsibility for appointing government senators to committees, a role filled in the House of Representatives by the Leader of the House.

The position of Leader of the Government in the Senate does not have a constitutional basis, but has existed since the first parliament in 1901 through longstanding parliamentary convention. Although it has similarities to the Senate Majority Leader in the United States and the Leader of the House of Lords in the United Kingdom, it was not based on either of those, but rather on the position of Leader of the Government in the Legislative Council found in Australia's colonial parliaments. Because government is formed in the House rather than the Senate, there is no guarantee that the Leader of the Government will be drawn from the largest party in the Senate. Unlike the Prime Minister, there is no requirement for the Leader of the Government to command the confidence of the chamber. It is not a cabinet post in its own right, and the holder of the office has always held at least one ministerial portfolio (though sometimes only the mostly honorific Vice-Presidency of the Executive Council).

The longest-serving Leader of the Government in the Senate was George Pearce, who held the position for a cumulative total of 15 years in three separate terms between 1914 and 1937. Uniquely, from 10 January to 1 February 1968, the positions of Prime Minister and Leader of the Government in the Senate were held by the same person, John Gorton. After the disappearance of Harold Holt, Gorton – a senator – was elected leader of the Liberal Party and thus ascended to the prime ministership. In line with constitutional convention, he resigned from the Senate to contest a by-election to the House of Representatives.

List of Leaders of the Government in the Senate

See also
 Leader of the Opposition in the Senate (Australia)
 Manager of Government Business in the Senate

Notes

References

Lists of Australian politicians
Lists of government ministers of Australia
Lists of political office-holders in Australia
Members of the Australian Senate
Members of the Cabinet of Australia